Vittoria may refer to:

People
 Vittoria (name), an Italian female given name, including a list of people
 Tomás Luis de Victoria or da Vittoria (c. 1548 – 1611), Spanish composer 
 Alessandro Vittoria (1525–1608), Italian sculptor

Places
Australia
 Vittoria, New South Wales
 Vittoria, Western Australia

Canada
 Vittoria, a community in Norfolk County, Ontario

Italy
 Vittoria, Sicily, Italy

Other uses
 Vittoria (ship), the name of several vessels
 , two Royal Navy ships
 Vittoria, an 1867 novel by George Meredith
 Vittoria, a 1905 play by Margaret Sherwood
 Vittoria Coffee, an Australian manufacturer of coffee products
 Vittoria S.p.A., an Italian bicycle tire manufacturer
 Vittoria Vetra, an Angels & Demons character
 A.S.D. Calcio Club Vittoria 2020, an Italian football club, based in Vittoria, Sicily

See also
 Vitoria (disambiguation)
 Vittorio